Events in the year 1956 in Mexico.

Incumbents

Federal government
 President: Adolfo Ruiz Cortines
 Interior Secretary (SEGOB): Ángel Carvajal Bernal
 Secretary of Foreign Affairs (SRE): Luis Padilla Nervo
 Communications Secretary (SCT): Carlos Lazo
 Education Secretary (SEP): José Ángel Ceniceros
 Secretary of Defense (SEDENA): Matias Ramos
 Secretary of Navy: Roberto Gómez Maqueo
 Secretary of Labor and Social Welfare: Adolfo López Mateos

Supreme Court

 President of the Supreme Court: Vicente Santos Guajardo

Governors

 Aguascalientes: Luis Ortega Douglas
 Baja California: Braulio Maldonado Sandez
 Campeche: Alberto Trueba Urbina
 Chiapas: Efraín Aranda Osorio
 Chihuahua: Jesús Lozoya Solís/Teófilo Borunda
 Coahuila: Ramón Cepeda López
 Colima: Rodolfo Chávez Carrillo
 Durango: Enrique Torres Sánchez/Francisco González de la Vega
 Guanajuato: J. Jesús Rodríguez Gaona
 Guerrero: Darío L. Arrieta Mateos
 Hidalgo: Quintín Rueda Villagrán
 Jalisco: Agustín Yáñez
 State of Mexico: Salvador Sánchez Colín
 Michoacán: Dámaso Cárdenas del Río/David Franco Rodríguez
 Morelos: Rodolfo López de Nava
 Nayarit: José Limón Guzmán
 Nuevo León: Raúl Rangel Frías
 Oaxaca: José Pacheco Iturribarría/Alfonso Pérez Gasca
 Puebla: Rafael Ávila Camacho
 Querétaro: Juan C. Gorraéz
 San Luis Potosí: Manuel Álvarez
 Sinaloa: Rigoberto Aguilar Pico 
 Sonora: Álvaro Obregón Tapia
 Tabasco: Miguel Orrico de los Llanos
 Tamaulipas: Horacio Terán
 Tlaxcala: Felipe Mazarraza	 
 Veracruz: Marco Antonio Muñoz Turnbull /Antonio María Quirasco
 Yucatán: Víctor Mena Palomo
 Zacatecas: José Minero Roque/Francisco E. García
Regent of the Federal District: Ernesto P. Uruchurtu

Events

 The Chemical Society of Mexico is formed. 
 April 30: The opening of the Torre Latinoamericana.

Awards
Belisario Domínguez Medal of Honor – Gerardo Murillo ("Dr. Atl")

Film

 List of Mexican films of 1956

Sport

 1955–56 Mexican Primera División season 
 The Diablos Rojos del México win the Mexican League.
 Mexico participate at the 1956 Summer Olympics. 
 Establishment of the Mexican Center League.
 January 1: Club de Futbol Ballenas Galeana Morelos is founded.

Births
 March 23 — Fidel Demédicis Hidalgo was a federal senator from Morelos (2012-2018)
April 21 — Ángel Aguirre Rivero, constitutional Governor of Guerrero 2011–2014 and interim Governor of Guerrero 1996–1999
June 8 — René Juárez Cisneros, Governor of Guerrero 1999-2005 and current federal Senator (d. 2021)
June 15 — Francisco Olvera Ruiz, Governor of Hidalgo 2011–2016 
June 22 — Manuel Saval, soap opera actor (Simplemente María (1989 TV series)) (d. 2009)
 July 31 — Laura Zapata, Mexican telenovela actress, singer and dancer
August 15 – Arnulfo Mejía Rojas, engineer, architect, teacher, historian, painter, artist, and Catholic priest, best known for being the creator of "The Boat of the Faith" (d. April 18, 2016).
September 8 – Ricardo Torres Origel, Mexican politician (PAN) Deputy (2000-2003) and Senator (2006-2012) from Guanajuato (d. April 24, 2016).
October 13 — Ana Bertha Espín, actress
October 19 — Francisco Rojas San Román, politician from the State of Mexico (d. 2018).
Date unknown — Rosario Robles, politician, acting Mayor of Mexico City 1999-2000

Deaths

References

 
Chile